Aseri Parish was a rural municipality of Ida-Viru County in northern Estonia.

Settlements
Small borough
Aseri

Villages
Aseriaru
- Kalvi
- Kestla
- Koogu
- Kõrkküla
- Kõrtsialuse
- Oru
- Rannu

References

Former municipalities of Estonia